Kenny Stucker (born June 11, 1970) is a former American football placekicker who played seven seasons in the Arena Football League with the Milwaukee Mustangs, Chicago Rush, New York Dragons and Tampa Bay Storm. He played college football at Ball State University.

College career
Stucker played for the Ball State Cardinals from 1988 to 1991. He was named to the All-MAC First Team as a junior and senior after being named to the second team as a freshman and sophomore. He connected on 93-of-96 extra points and 62-of-87 field goals in his career. Stucker was selected to play in Blue-Gray College Football All-Star Game after his senior season. He was inducted into the Ball State Athletics Hall of Fame in 2009.

Professional career

Milwaukee Mustangs
Stucker played for the Milwaukee Mustangs from 1994 to 1999. He was named First Team All-Arena in 1996 and 1998. He was also named AFL Kicker of the Year in 1998. Stucker was also the last player, as of 2014, in the Arena Football League to have connected on a two-point dropkick, which took place in 1997.

Chicago Rush
Stucker came out of retirement to sign with the Chicago Rush during the team'd playoff run in 2002.

New York Dragons
Stucker played for the New York Dragons at the start of the 2003 Arena Football League season. He was released by the Dragons on March 8, 2003.

Chicago Rush
Stucker signed with the Chicago Rush on March 15, 2003. He was released by the Rush on March 28, 2003.

Tampa Bay Storm
He spent time with the Tampa Bay Storm during the 2003 season.

References

External links
Just Sports Stats
College stats

Living people
1970 births
Players of American football from Miami
American football placekickers
Ball State Cardinals football players
Milwaukee Mustangs (1994–2001) players
Chicago Rush players
New York Dragons players
Tampa Bay Storm players